Eoophyla orphninalis is a moth in the family Crambidae. It was described by Pagenstecher in 1886. It is found on the Aru Islands.

References

Eoophyla
Moths described in 1886